The men's 100 metres at the 2019 World Para Athletics Championships was held in Dubai from 7–15 November.

Medalists

Events listed in pink were contested but no medals were awarded.

T11

Records

Schedule 
The event schedule, in local time (UTC+4), was as follows:

Round 1 
First 1 in each heat (Q) and the next 4 fastest (q) advance to the semifinals.

Semifinals 
First 1 in each heat (Q) and the next 2 fastest (q) advance to the final.

Final 
The final was started on 13 November at 18:36.

T12

Records

Schedule 
The event schedule, in local time (UTC+4), was as follows:

Round 1 
First 1 in each heat (Q) and the next 5 fastest (q) advance to the semifinals.

Semifinals 
First 1 in each heat (Q) and the next 1 fastest (q) advance to the final.

Final 
The final was started on 12 November at 19:57.

T13

Records

Schedule 
The event schedule, in local time (UTC+4), was as follows:

Round 1 
First 2 in each heat (Q) and the next 2 fastest (q) advance to the final.

Final 
The final was started on 13 November at 19:15.

T33

Records

Schedule 
The event schedule, in local time (UTC+4), was as follows:

Final 
The final was started on 13 November at 19:15.

T34

Records

Schedule 
The event schedule, in local time (UTC+4), was as follows:

Round 1 
First 3 in each heat (Q) and the next 2 fastest (q) advance to the final.

Final 
The final was started on 10 November at 20:19.

T35

Records

Schedule 
The event schedule, in local time (UTC+4), was as follows:

Round 1 
First 3 in each heat (Q) and the next 2 fastest (q) advance to the final.

Final 
The final was started on 15 November at 18:42.

T36

Records

Schedule 
The event schedule, in local time (UTC+4), was as follows:

Round 1 
First 3 in each heat (Q) and the next 2 fastest (q) advance to the final.

Final 
The final was started on 10 November at 19:23.

T37

Records

Schedule 
The event schedule, in local time (UTC+4), was as follows:

Round 1 
First 3 in each heat (Q) and the next 2 fastest (q) advance to the final.

Final 
The final was started on 11 November at 18:53.

T38

Records

Schedule 
The event schedule, in local time (UTC+4), was as follows:

Round 1 
First 2 in each heat (Q) and the next 2 fastest (q) advance to the final.

Final 
The final was started on 11 November at 19.21.

T47

Records

Schedule 
The event schedule, in local time (UTC+4), was as follows:

Round 1 
First 3 in each heat (Q) and the next 4 fastest (q) advance to the semifinal.

Semifinals 
First 3 in each heat (Q) and the next 2 fastest (q) advance to the final.

Final 
The final was started on 12 November at 20:13.

T51

Records

Schedule 
The event schedule, in local time (UTC+4), was as follows:

Final 
The final was started on 7 November at 22:00.

T52

Records

Schedule 
The event schedule, in local time (UTC+4), was as follows:

Round 1 
First 3 in each heat (Q) and the next 2 fastest (q) advance to the final.

Final 
The final was started on 12 November at 20:37.

T53

Records

Schedule 
The event schedule, in local time (UTC+4), was as follows:

Round 1 
First 3 in each heat (Q) and the next 2 fastest (q) advance to the final.

Final 
The final was started on 8 November at 20:02.

T54

Records

Schedule 
The event schedule, in local time (UTC+4), was as follows:

Round 1 
First 3 in each heat (Q) and the next 4 fastest (q) advance to the semifinal.

Semifinals 
First 3 in each heat (Q) and the next 2 fastest (q) advance to the final.

Final 
The final was started on 8 November at 18:09.

T63

Records

Schedule 
The event schedule, in local time (UTC+4), was as follows:

Round 1 
First 3 in each heat (Q) and the next 2 fastest (q) advance to the final.

Final 
The final was started on 15 November at 18:53.

T64

Records

Schedule 
The event schedule, in local time (UTC+4), was as follows:

Round 1 
First 2 in each heat (Q) and the next 2 fastest (q) advance to the final.

Final 
The final was started on 11 November at 18:43.

RR3

Schedule 
The event schedule, in local time (UTC+4), was as follows:

Final 
The final was started on 15 November at 18:20.

See also
List of IPC world records in athletics

References

100 metres
2019 in men's athletics
100 metres at the World Para Athletics Championships